Soğucak can refer to:

 Soğucak
 Soğucak, Alaca
 Soğucak, İskilip
 Soğucak, Savaştepe
 Soğucak, Yenice